Rawstorne is a surname. Notable people with the surname include:

Atherton Rawstorne (1855–1936), British bishop, son of Robert
George Rawstorne (1895–1962), British soldier and cricketer
Robert Rawstorne (1824–1902), British archdeacon

See also
Rawsthorne